is a Japanese actor, producer, and digital effects artist who became widely known for starring in NBC's Heroes as Hiro Nakamura and in CBS's Hawaii Five-0 as Doctor Max Bergman.

Early life
Oka was born in Tokyo, Japan, to Setsuko Oka. His parents divorced when he was one month old; he was raised in a single parent family and has never met his father. He was six years old when he and his mother moved to Los Angeles from Japan. At age eight, he appeared on the CBS-TV game show Child's Play. In 1987, a 12-year-old Oka was featured as one of several children on the cover of Time magazine, for the article "Those Asian-American Whiz Kids." Though he was not featured in the article itself, he was acquainted with the photographer who conducted the shoot. In 1988, he placed fourth in the California state MATHCOUNTS competition and was one of the four students to represent the state of California in the national competition.

Oka attended Brown University, where he was musical director of The Bear Necessities all-male a cappella group. He graduated in 1997 with a BS in computer science and mathematics and a minor in theater arts.

Oka landed his first job after graduation at Industrial Light & Magic, George Lucas's motion picture visual special effects company, with the hope of one day earning an Oscar for technical work on a motion picture. He was also featured in the San Francisco Chronicle with ILM co-worker Anthony Shafer in a pre-dot-com article where he echoed his desire to meld acting and technology. He worked on the Star Wars prequel trilogy.

Acting career

2000–2005: Move to Los Angeles and working actor 
Oka first tried acting in 2000. He earned a Screen Actors Guild card by appearing in industry films, then moved to Los Angeles. ILM stipulated in his contract that he could work at its Los Angeles branch but would have to return to their Marin County, California, location if he did not get cast for a recurring role that season. Oka was cast in a television pilot, and although the show was not picked up, it satisfied the contract's requirements, and he was allowed to work in Los Angeles.

During this period, Oka landed several minor roles in film and television, such as Austin Powers in Goldmember (2002) and the "Dances with Couch" episode of the sitcom Yes, Dear.  He eventually landed a recurring role as Franklyn on the NBC comedy Scrubs.

He was featured in a North American commercial for Sega's 2002 PlayStation 2 video game, Shinobi, with the catchphrase 'Shinobi's back!' in front of Sega's 1987 Shinobi arcade cabinet.

2006–2010: Heroes and mainstream recognition 
In 2006, Oka was cast as the time-manipulating Hiro Nakamura in the NBC television series Heroes. Oka translated his own dialogue for the show, from English to Japanese; English subtitles accompanied his Japanese dialogue on the show. Prior to this, he was expecting to forgo acting by the end of that year's pilot season in lieu of pursuing writing and producing. Heroes was a breakout hit, and his portrayal of Nakamura earned him nominations for both a Golden Globe Award for Best Supporting Actor – Series, Miniseries or Television Film and a Primetime Emmy Award for Outstanding Supporting Actor in a Drama Series, the only actor on the show to be nominated on either award shows. He was named the Coolest Geek at the Spike TV Guys' Choice Awards on June 13, 2007. In 2007, he presented an award with Heroes co-star Hayden Panettiere on the 20th annual Nickelodeon Kids' Choice Awards.

In addition to his work on the show, he continued to work at ILM up to three days a week as a research and development technical director, writing programs that create special effects.

He played the role of Bruce in the big screen version of Get Smart. He played a real estate broker who is trying to sell to Seann William Scott's character in Steve Conrad's The Promotion.

2010–present: Hawaii Five-0 and other projects 
Oka played the coroner Dr. Max Bergman in CBS' Hawaii Five-0, a remake of  the original series which aired from 1968 to 1980. He joined the show's main cast in the second series. His character was written as an ethnic Japanese who was adopted at birth by Jewish parents, hence his last name. Oka also made an appearance in the film Friends with Benefits.

In 2015, Oka reprised his role as Hiro Nakamura in NBC's miniseries Heroes Reborn.

Oka has turned his digital effects skills to video game production, founding the video game development studio Mobius Digital, where he was a producer on the critically acclaimed Outer Wilds.

Personal life
Oka is fluent in Japanese, English and Spanish. He worked on the 1992 Summer Olympics as an English, Spanish, and Japanese translator. 
He played chess in his youth and had an Elo rating of 1800.

Similar to his character Hiro Nakamura, Oka also collects manga. He co-produced the 2017 American adaptation of the manga series Death Note. He also founded the video game studio Mobius Digital Games, mainly known for its game Outer Wilds.

He has earned the rank of black belt in kendō (Japanese fencing).

Filmography

Television

Film

Video games

Digital effects artist

Audiobook

References

External links

 
 Daily Telegraph Article
 NY Times Article
 Brown University "From Special Effects to Acting, CS Alum Masi Oka is One of the 'Heroes'"
 Brown Daily Herald by Alissa Cerny 9/18/06 "Brown alum snags big role in NBC series 'Heroes'"
 Time magazine cover – August 31, 1987 (Masi Oka is to the farthest left)
 Nichi Bei Times Interview
 San Francisco Chronicle Article

1974 births
20th-century American male actors
21st-century American male actors
American kendoka
American male actors of Japanese descent
American male film actors
American male television actors
American film actors of Asian descent
Brown University alumni
Harvard-Westlake School alumni
Japanese emigrants to the United States
Japanese male film actors
Living people
Male actors from Los Angeles
Male actors from New York City
Male actors from Tokyo
Special effects people
Industrial Light & Magic people